Madelyn Vega is a Puerto Rican journalist and attorney who currently works at La Sierra University in Riverside, California. She previously served as a Judge for the Commonwealth of Puerto Rico and was an anchor and reporter for Telemundo in New York for over a decade.

Early career 
Vega began her career in 1984 as a radio announcer and reporter in Puerto Rico, for the all news radio stations WKAQ (AM) and Noti Uno, where she became the News Director. Later she joined Channel 24, Multimedia Puerto Rico, an all news television network, as an anchor/reporter.

While working as Public Relations Director for the Interamerican University of Puerto Rico, she edited and wrote part of the book Journalism in Puerto Rico. In 1990 she joined Telemundo San Juan as an anchor/reporter, which helped her become a recognized figure in the Island. During this time she enrolled in the University of Puerto Rico Law School, and, after graduating cum laude, was admitted to the Bar. She also holds a master's degree in Psychology and Counseling, graduating summa cum laude, and a BA in literature, cum laude, both from the University of Puerto Rico, Rio Piedras Campus.

She joined Telemundo 47 in New York in 2001, and covered the September 11, 2001 attacks. She anchored the morning show for four years. At Telemundo-New York she was also an anchor and special projects reporter.

While she maintained a high-profile career as a broadcast journalist, Vega also dedicated time to her legal interests, mostly ad honorem. She developed a legal TV segment while at Telemundo NBC that aired for over 10 years.

After more than 20 years as a journalist, Vega decided to pursue her legal career, and took the New Jersey Bar in 2007. She is admitted as a member of the New Jersey Bar, the Puerto Rico Bar and the Federal Bar. She joined the New York State Department of Labor where her efforts were geared to enforce the department's initiatives to reach out to workers and empower them with knowledge about their labor rights.

In 2008 she was appointed as a judge for the Commonwealth of Puerto Rico. After fulfilling her appointment, Vega relocated to California and worked for the California State University system. She joined La Sierra University and served as the director of the Title IX Office, Special Assistant to the President for Diversity, Equity and inclusion, and adjunct professor for the Zapara School of Business and the School of Education. In 2022 Prof. Vega Ortiz was appointed as Associate Professor for the Criminal Justice Department at La Sierra University. She still writes freelance.

Education 
Earned a  B.A.: Biology. Language Studies, Education in 1978 and a M.A.: Education/Counseling in 1980 from University of Puerto Rico, Rio Piedras Campus. Completed a Juris Doctor from the University of Puerto Rico School of Law in 1989.

Awards 
Vega was nominated for three Emmy Awards for her reporting work for 2008, and was nominated for an Emmy Award in 2007 for On-Camera Achievement. During her career as a reporter she won numerous awards, including six Paoli Awards, three Overseas Press Club Awards, and an ACE award. Vega was the recipient of more than 12 Excellence in Journalism awards, in both New York and Puerto Rico. She was chosen as one of the Outstanding Personalities by the New York Puerto Rico Institute and was selected as a Distinguished Citizen by the Commonwealth of Puerto Rico Senate.

She is a former president of the Overseas Press Club of Puerto Rico and co-director of the National Association of Hispanic Journalists Puerto Rico Chapter.

Publications
Vega is also a prolific freelance writer who writes editorial columns, travel stories and educational materials. She has published twelve books. Her most recent publication is The Island and the Storm, in which Ms. Vega explains the devastation that affected Puerto Rico after Hurricane Maria hit the island in 2017. In the book, Ms. Vega explores how during the past eight decades, Puerto Ricans have been forced to emigrate to the mainland because of economic limitations in the island and how Puerto Ricans have endured social, racial and ethnic discrimination. The book was published in March 2019.

Ms. Vega started her writing career as the editor of the textbook Journalism in Puerto Rico in 1987. In 2007 she published the book Letters to my Son for Editorial Cultural. In March 2014, a second issue was published: Letters to my Son 2. The third issue, Letters to my Son 3, was published in October, 2016.

Vega has also released a series of children's books. On October 9, 2015, she published the collection of children's stories Tommy, the Traveling Dolphin 1, 2 and 3. The publication follows a bilingual format: English and Spanish. The second edition of "Tommy, the Traveling Dolphin" was published in March, 2019.Fanti and Other Stories, a children's stories book also in bilingual format, was published on April 20, 2016. Vega released Preciosa/Beauty, her fifth children's stories book, in December 2016.

In December 2015 Vega published the book Puerto Rico: Stories and Verses, a collection of stories and poems about her upbringing in her native Puerto Rico. It includes a photographic essay that portrays the natural beauty of the island. This was a joint effort with her son, Xavier Torres Vega.

Personal life 
Vega was born in New York City after her parents emigrated there for a few years. The family returned to Puerto Rico, where she was raised.

Vega is also a Christian singer and hymn composer. She released her first CD of original songs, Por todo gracias/That's Why I Thank You, in December 2015. In November 2016, she released her second CD of original songs, Alma Nueva/Born Again.

She is married to composer and conductor Raymond Torres-Santos, with whom she is the parent of one child.

References

External links
Profile

Puerto Rican journalists
Year of birth missing (living people)
Living people
American television journalists
American women television journalists
Journalists from New York City
University of Puerto Rico alumni